In mathematics, Gårding's inequality is a result that gives a lower bound for the bilinear form induced by a real linear elliptic partial differential operator. The inequality is named after Lars Gårding.

Statement of the inequality

Let Ω be a bounded, open domain in n-dimensional Euclidean space and let Hk(Ω) denote the Sobolev space of k-times weakly differentiable functions u : Ω → R with weak derivatives in L2. Assume that Ω satisfies the k-extension property, i.e., that there exists a bounded linear operator E : Hk(Ω) → Hk(Rn) such that (Eu)|Ω = u for all u in Hk(Ω).

Let L be a linear partial differential operator of even order 2k, written in divergence form

and suppose that L is uniformly elliptic, i.e., there exists a constant θ > 0 such that

Finally, suppose that the coefficients Aαβ are bounded, continuous functions on the closure of Ω for |α| = |β| = k and that

Then Gårding's inequality holds: there exist constants C > 0 and G ≥ 0

where

is the bilinear form associated to the operator L.

Application: the Laplace operator and the Poisson problem

Be careful, in this application, Garding's Inequality seems useless here as the final result is a direct consequence of Poincaré's Inequality, or Friedrich Inequality. (See talk on the article). 

As a simple example, consider the Laplace operator Δ.  More specifically, suppose that one wishes to solve, for f ∈ L2(Ω) the Poisson equation

where Ω is a bounded Lipschitz domain in Rn.  The corresponding weak form of the problem is to find u in the Sobolev space H01(Ω) such that

where

The Lax–Milgram lemma ensures that if the bilinear form B is both continuous and elliptic with respect to the norm on H01(Ω), then, for each f ∈ L2(Ω), a unique solution u must exist in H01(Ω).  The hypotheses of Gårding's inequality are easy to verify for the Laplace operator Δ, so there exist constants C and G ≥ 0

Applying the Poincaré inequality allows the two terms on the right-hand side to be combined, yielding a new constant K > 0 with

which is precisely the statement that B is elliptic.  The continuity of B is even easier to see:  simply apply the Cauchy–Schwarz inequality and the fact that the Sobolev norm is controlled by the L2 norm of the gradient.

References

  (Theorem 9.17)

Theorems in functional analysis
Inequalities
Partial differential equations
Sobolev spaces